The Tahiti women's national under-20 football team is the highest women's youth team of women's football in French Polynesia and is controlled by the Fédération Tahitienne de Football. The team consists of a selection of players from French Polynesia, and not just Tahiti.

History
The Tahiti women's under-20 football team had never competed at the OFC U-20 Women's Championship. However in 2019, they competed for the first time, finishing in 3rd place.

OFC Championship Record

Current technical staff

Current squad
The following players were called up for the 2019 OFC U-19 Women's Championship from 30 August–12 September in Avarua, the Cook Islands.

Caps and goals updated as of 31 August 2019, after the game against American Samoa.

References

Oceanian women's national under-20 association football teams
Under-20